This article lists the winners and nominees for the NAACP Image Award for Outstanding Children's Program. First awarded in 1982, the category was quickly retired until 1995. Since its return, Teen Summit holds the record for most wins in this category with six.

Winners and nominees
Winners are listed first and highlighted in bold.

1980s

1990s

2000s

2010s

2020s
{| class="wikitable" style="width:100%;"
|- style="background:#bebebe;"
! style="width:11%;"| Year
! style="width:84%;"| Series
! style="width:5%;"| Ref
|-
| rowspan="6" align="center"| 2020
|- style="background:#B0C4DE"
| Family Reunion
| rowspan="6" align="center"| 
|-
| Doc McStuffins
|-
| Kevin Hart's Guide to Black History
|-
| Marvel's Avengers: Black Panther's Quest
|-
| Motown Magic
|-
| rowspan="6" align="center"| 2021
|- style="background:#B0C4DE"
| Family Reunion
| rowspan="6" align="center"| 
|-
| Bookmarks: Celebrating Black Voices
|-
| Craig of the Creek
|-
| Raven's Home
|-
| We Are the Dream: The Kids of the Oakland MLK Oratorical
|-
| rowspan="6" align="center"|
2022
|- style="background:#B0C4DE"
| '''Family Reunion
| rowspan="6" align="center" |
|-
| Ada Twist, Scientist
|-
| Karma's World
|-
| Raven's Home
|-
| Waffles + Mochi|}

Multiple wins and nominations
Wins

 6 wins
 Teen Summit 4 wins
 Doc McStuffins 3 wins
 That's So Raven Family Reunion 2 wins
 Dora the ExplorerNominations

 7 nominations
 Dora the Explorer Reading Rainbow Teen Summit 6 nominations
 Doc McStuffins 4 nominations
 Go, Diego! Go! Gullah, Gullah Island Sesame Street 3 nominations
 The Backyardigans Nickelodeon HALO Awards That's So Raven True Jackson, VP 2 nominations
 All That A.N.T. Farm Cory in the House Cousin Skeeter K.C. Undercover Kenan & Kel Little Bill The Proud Family''

References

NAACP Image Awards